Jason B. Diamond, M.D., F.A.C.S. (born December 21, 1970 in Glen Ridge, New Jersey) is an American plastic surgeon and television personality.

Early life
Diamond attended the University of Rochester School of Medicine.

Career
Diamond has appeared on the E! Network show, Dr. 90210. Diamond has been featured in various print media, such as People Magazine, Vogue, Elle, and Marie Claire.

In 2010, Diamond got his license to perform surgery in Dubai.

He is in private practice specializing in facial plastic and reconstructive surgery and has offices in Beverly Hills, New York City, Dubai, and Moscow.

Published works
 Diamond, Jason; Gerut, Zachary E; Shire, James R.; Nguyen, Davis B.; Chen, Achih H.; Desmond, Julian C.; Silvati-Fidell, Laura; Abrams, Steve Zvi. "Exploratory, Randomized, Controlled, Phase 2 Study to Evaluate the Safety and Efficacy of Adjuvant Fibrin Sealant VH S/D 4 S-Apr (ARTISS) in Patients Undergoing Rhytidectomy." Aesthetic Surgery Journal. 33.3 (2013): 323-333. Print. 
 Dr Jason Diamond Reviews; Manaligod, J., Free Radical Damage: A Possible Mechanism of Laryngeal Aging, ENT Journal 2002; 81: 531 – 31. 
 "A Single Dose, Open Label Three Way Crossover, Randomized Pilot Bioavailability Study of Midozolam. Comparing Intranasal Administration to Intramuscular Administration in Healthy Human Volunteers." University of Kentucky Medical Center Protocol Mz0001.
 "A single dose, Open Label, Randomized Three Way Crossover, Bioavailability Study of 1.0 mg and 2.0 Intranasal Butorphanol Tartrate Compared to 2.0 mg. Intravenous Botorphanol Tartrate In Healthy Human Volunteers." University of Kentucky Chandler Medical Center Protocol BT002.
 "A single Dose, Randomized Two Period Crossover Pharmacokinetic Study of 2.0 mg Intranasal Hydromorphone Hydrochloride In Healthy Human Volunteers Using 10 mg/ml and 20 mg/ml Formulations. University of Kentucky Medical Center Protocol HM-114.

References

Further reading

External links 
 

1970 births
Living people
Participants in American reality television series
American plastic surgeons
University of Rochester alumni
People from Glen Ridge, New Jersey